Thomason may refer to:

People
Thomason (surname)

Other uses
University Medical Center (El Paso, Texas), formerly known as Thomason Hospital, a non-profit public hospital in El Paso, Texas
Thomason Collection of English Civil War Tracts, a collection of material dating from 1640 to 1661
USS John W. Thomason (DD-760), an Allen M. Sumner-class destroyer, United States Navy ship
USS Thomason (DE-203), a Buckley-class destroyer escort of the United States Navy

See also
 Thompson (surname)
 Thomsen
 Thomson (disambiguation)
 Clan MacTavish